Tidmarsh is a village in West Berkshire, England. Its development is mainly residential and agricultural, and is centred on the A340 road between Pangbourne and Theale. The rural area is bounded by the M4 motorway to the south.

Geography
Its civil parish council is, unusually in this district, shared with another village and is called Tidmarsh with Sulham. Further east, Sulham Woods separate the villages from Tilehurst, a western suburb of Reading.

Woodland covers less than a tenth of its total area but about a quarter of the western or south-western higher ground. The Pang flows north through the village and then through the Moor Copse Nature Reserve on its way to join the River Thames at Pangbourne.

History
If so, however, the southern portion has been straightened in later years. The earliest mention of Tidmarsh was in 1196. In 1239 there was a land-ownership dispute concerning the manor. There are records of a water corn-mill and a fishery in Tidmarsh in 1305. The 18th century successor to the mill is now Grade II listed and converted to domestic accommodation. There are multiple World War II pillboxes surrounding Tidmarsh, which made up part of the GHQ Line.

Notable buildings

 
The most conspicuous listed building in Tidmarsh is the 13th century half-timbered Greyhound Pub, which suffered a serious fire in 2005. 

Another historic building is the Grade I listed, 12th century church, which is dedicated to St Laurence. The church is particularly notable for its Norman south doorway, "very rare 13th century polygonal apse" and 13th century lancet windows. The church was restored and modified in the 19th century. The old rectory dates from 1856. 

Other notable buildings include the Grade II listed Round House and Mill House.

Notable residents
Notable residents include author Lytton Strachey (1880-1932) and the painter Dora Carrington (1893-1932), who lived in the Mill House between 1917 and 1924. Carrington painted the Greyhound Pub sign in the village. Rex Partridge, renamed Ralph by the Bloomsbury set, also settled at Tidmarsh and formed a very 'Bloomsbury' trio with Lytton and Dora. 21st century development in Tidmarsh has included housing at the north end of the village, Strachey Close.

Demography

References

External links

 Tidmarsh-with-Sulham Website
 Berkshire History: Tidmarsh
 Moor Copse Website
 The Greyhound, Tidmarsh

Villages in Berkshire
Civil parishes in Berkshire
West Berkshire District
Former civil parishes in Berkshire